Three Wishes (simplified Chinese: 三个愿望) is a Singaporean television drama series produced by Wawa Pictures. Starring Huang Biren, Thomas Ong, Julie Tan, Shane Pow, Zhu Houren, Jin Yinji and Tan Junsheng as the main characters in the story. It is also the fourth Wawa-production to air on MediaCorp Channel 8. The fantasy drama series revolves around a man facing mid-life crisis and how humans will sacrifice their families due of greed.

It had aired on MediaCorp Channel 8 in Singapore from 27 October 2014 to 21 November 2014. During this period, a total of 20 episodes will air.

Episodic synopsis

See also
Three Wishes (Singaporean TV series)
List of programmes broadcast by Mediacorp Channel 8

References

External links
Wawa Pictures

Lists of Singaporean television series episodes
Lists of soap opera episodes
2014 Singaporean television series debuts
2014 Singaporean television series endings